Erioconopa is a genus of crane fly in the family Limoniidae.

Distribution
It is found within the Palearctic realm.

Species
E. diuturna (Walker, 1848)
E. elegantula (Alexander, 1913)
E. harukawai (Alexander, 1926)
E. interposita Stary, 1976
E. symplectoides (Kuntze, 1914)
E. tadzika (Savchenko, 1972)
E. trivialis (Meigen, 1818)

References

Limoniidae
Nematocera genera
Diptera of Europe
Diptera of Asia